Chemi Shalev (born 14 April 1953) is an  Israeli journalist.

Biography
Menachem (Chemi) Shalev was born in Washington, D.C. Shalev is married with three daughters and lives in Givatayim.

Journalism career
Shalev began his journalism career at the Jerusalem Post under David Landau. He was the US correspondent for Haaretz newspaper in 2011-2016. He publishes an English-language blog called "West of Eden" dealing with Israel–United States relations and the American Jewish community. Previously, Shalev was deputy editor and diplomatic commentator for Israel Hayom newspaper. He served as diplomatic correspondent for The Jerusalem Post, Davar and Ma'ariv.
 
Shalev was the Jerusalem correspondent for the New York-based Jewish weekly, The Forward. In 2007, he returned from a four-year stay in Australia, where he was associate editor of The Australian Jewish News.

See also
Journalism in Israel

References

External links
2008 briefing to Israel Policy Forum 
2003 briefing for Brookings Institution

Israeli journalists
1953 births
Living people
People from Washington, D.C.